Evangelical School may refer to;

 Armenian Evangelical Central High School, Lebanon 
 Armenian Evangelical School of Trad, East Beirut, Lebanon
 Basel Evangelical Mission Higher Secondary School, Palakkad, India
 Basel Evangelical School, Mangalore, Karnataka, India
 Bethel Evangelical Secondary School, Dembidolo, Qelem (Kelem) Welega Zone, Oromia Region, Ethiopia
 Evangelical Christian School, Tennessee, U.S.
 Evangelical School of Smyrna, Greece
 National Evangelical School (disambiguation)
 Trinity Evangelical Divinity School, Illinois, U.S.
 Tripoli Evangelical School, Tripoli, North Lebanon